Yuan Mei (1716–1797) was a Chinese painter and poet of the Qing Dynasty. He was often mentioned with Ji Yun as the "Nan Yuan Bei Ji".

Biography

Early life
Yuan Mei was born in Qiantang (in modern Hangzhou), Zhejiang province, to a cultured family who had never before attained high office. He achieved the degree of jinshi in 1739 at the young age of 23 and was immediately appointed to the Hanlin Academy. Then, from 1742 to 1748, Yuan Mei served as a magistrate in four different provinces in Jiangsu. However, in 1748, shortly after being assigned to administer part of Nanjing, he resigned his post and returned to his hometown to pursue his literary interest.

Literary career

In the decades before his death, Yuan Mei produced a large body of poetry, essays and paintings. His works reflected his interest in Chan Buddhism and the supernatural, at the expense of Daoism and institutional Buddhism - both of which he rejected. Yuan is most famous for his poetry, which has been described as possessing "unusually clear and elegant language". His views on poetry as expressed in the  stressed the importance of personal feeling and technical perfection. In his later years, Yuan Mei came to be called "Mister Suiyuan". Among his other collected works are treatises on passing the imperial examinations and food.

Throughout his lifetime, Yuan Mei travelled extensively throughout southern China, visiting Huangshan, Guilin, Tiantai, Wuyi and other famous mountains. On some of those visits, Yuan kept journal entries, representative of which is the You Guilin zhu shan ji ("Record of tours of the mountains of Guilin"). He also accepted students. Since he admired women's poetry, he also took several female students and helped them publish their work under their own names.

Beliefs and women's literacy 
Yuan was opposed to the strict moral and aesthetic norms of his day and valued creativity and self-expression. He advocated for women's literacy. Yuan was both famed and criticized for his Sui Garden where women would gather to compose and recite poetry. Two of Yuan's sisters enjoyed praise for their literary talent.

Wonder tales 

His anthology of supernatural tales, the Zi buyu ( lit. "What the Master does not Speak of", i.e., "Censored by Confucius" was first published 1788, and later retitled Xin Qi xie ("New wonder tales from Qi"). It contained some 747 tales, followed by a sequel anthology.

The work is classified under the biji fiction genre), but they are anecdotes collected over many years, purporting to be actual events recorded by the author.

Gastronomic work 

The food writer Fuchsia Dunlop has described Yuan as "China’s Brillat-Savarin,"   and Endymion Wilkinson called him one of the four classical gastronomes. In a time when the taste among his contemporaries was for opulence and exotic display, Yuan stood for the "orthodox" style. "Nowadays," he wrote, "at the start of the feast the menu is about a hundred feet long". This is "mere display, not gastronomy". After one such dinner Yuan returned home and cooked congee to appease his hunger. He instructed cooks "do not fuss with the natural state of the food just to show that you are a clever cook. Bird's nest is beautiful -- why shape it into balls?" Yuan criticized his contemporary Li Liweng's magnolia pudding as "created by artifice". Yuan also resented what he regarded as the corruption of Chinese food by Manchu cooks. The appeal of Manchu cooking was in their stews and roasts, while Chinese cooked broths and soups, but when Manchus serve Chinese dinners and Chinese serve Manchu food, "we lose our originality" and we "toady to each other".

Yuan published his recipes and thoughts on cooking in his 1792 gastronomic manual and cookbook The Way of Eating. A complete and annotated translation was published in 2019.

Editions and translations 
 Yuan Mei, Yingzhong Wang and Yingzhi Wang, eds.  (Sui Yuan Shi Dan). Nanjing: Feng huang chubanshe, 2006. .
translations

Further reading
 Arthur Waley. Yuan Mei, Eighteenth Century Chinese Poet. London: Allen & Unwin,  1956

References 
Citations

Bibliography

External links

 
 
 随园食单 (Sui Yuan Shi Dan) Chinese text
 Suiyuan Shidan (隨園食單) English translation

1716 births
1797 deaths
18th-century Chinese painters
18th-century Chinese poets
18th-century Chinese LGBT people
Chinese cuisine
Chinese LGBT poets
Chinese LGBT painters
Poets from Zhejiang
Qing dynasty painters
Qing dynasty poets
Painters from Zhejiang
Writers from Hangzhou